This is a list of movies featuring recognizable dance forms, demonstrating them, shedding light on their origin, or being the base of a plot.

This article is not about Dance film or Dance for camera which are separate genres. It is also not about Musical films, although they often contain a significant amount of dancing. However, they are a specific form of art in itself, therefore their listings generally pertain to the articles specifically related to the topic of musicals. This by no means prevents musicals from being included here, but they are required to meet the outlined criteria. Fred Astaire's and Gene Kelly's filmographies may significantly contribute to these lists.

Films with plot based on dance

Ballet
 The Red Shoes (1948) - Film classic with dance editing far ahead of its time. Directed by Michael Powell and Emeric Pressburger, starring Moira Shearer. Intricately weaving backstage life with the thrill of performance, this film centers on the dilemma of a young ballerina torn between the composer who loves her and the impresario determined to fashion her into a great dancer. 134 min, and based loosely on the fairytale.
 The Tales of Hoffmann (1951) - Directed by Michael Powell and Emeric Pressburger, starring Moira Shearer and Ludmilla Tchérina. Film version of Jacques Offenbach's opera but making full use of film techniques and special effects. Not just a film of a stage production.
 An American in Paris (1951) - Oscar-winning musical based on George Gershwin's compositions starring Gene Kelly and Leslie Caron.
 Suspiria (1977) - A legendary horror film directed by Italian Dario Argento where a new student at a dance academy/school for girls experiences strange goings on.
 The Turning Point (1977) - The story of two women whose lives are dedicated to ballet. Deedee left her promising dance career to become a wife and mother and now runs a ballet school in Oklahoma. Emma stayed with a company and became a star though her time is nearly past. Both want what the other has and reflects back on missed chances as they are brought together again through Deedee's daughter who joins the company. Starring: Shirley MacLaine, Anne Bancroft, Tom Skerrit, Anthony Zerbe, Leslie Browne, Mikhail Baryshnikov and Alexandra Danilova.
 White Nights (1985) - movie starring Mikhail Baryshnikov about a Russian dancer who wants to defect.
 Dancers (1987) - movie starring Mikhail Baryshnikov about a ballet company.
 Billy Elliot (2000)
 Center Stage (2000) - movie about the students of the American Ballet Academy.
 Save the Last Dance (2001) - movie starring Julia Stiles as a girl who wants to study as a professional dancer.
 Dracula: Pages from a Virgin's Diary (2002) - A silent movie directed by Guy Maddin, a ballet interpretation of Dracula.
 The Company (2003) - An inside look at the world of ballet. With the complete cooperation of the Joffrey Ballet of Chicago, Robert Altman follows the stories of the dancers, whose professional and personal lives grow impossibly close, as they cope with the demands of a life in the ballet. Neve Campbell plays a gifted but conflicted company member on the verge of becoming a principal dancer at a fictional Chicago troupe, with Malcolm McDowell playing the company's co-founder and artistic director, considered one of America's most exciting choreographers. James Franco plays Campbell's boyfriend and one of the few characters not involved in the world of dance.
 Wishing Stairs (2003) - South Korean horror film set in an all-girls art school, in which two of the main characters are competing ballet students.
 Flying Boys (2004) - South Korean film about a group of high school seniors who are reluctantly pressured into joining a ballet class.
 Dancing with Time (2007) - Four dancers, nearing their eighties, take up the challenge of Heike Hennig to return to the stage in Leipzig's opera house.
 Ballet Shoes (film) (2007) - Three adopted sisters, Pauline, Petrova and Posy Fossil where each has a different talent: acting, machinery and ballet.Center Stage: Turn It Up (2008) - Kate Parker auditions for the American Ballet Academy but she doesn't get a place. She starts work in a trendy hip-hop club and teams up with a former hockey player as she continues to perfect her dance skills. This movie isn't really a sequel to 'Center Stage' [2000] as there's no continuation or development of the original film's storyline, although a couple of the characters (dance teachers played by Peter Gallagher and Ethan Stiefel) from the first movie reappear in this one.
 Mao's Last Dancer (film) (2009) - Based on the autobiography of Chinese dancer Li Cunxin, this movie tells the story of his selection from an impoverished rural village to train at Madame Mao's Beijing Dance Academy. The film then follows Li as he travels to the US and is confronted with cultural differences (East/West; Communist/capitalist) and his desire to be true to his artistic soul. Directed by Bruce Beresford.
 Dance Subaru! (2009)
 Black Swan (film) (2010)
 Tutu Much (2010) - Traces the stories of 9 young girls vying for a place in the prestigious Royal Winnipeg Ballet School. Follows each girl as she participates in a month-long summer intensive that serves as an audition for the school.
Dance Academy (2010)- Fifteen-year-old Tara Webster has grown up on a farm in country Australia and has dreamt of being a dancer ever since she was a little girl. When she makes it into the National Academy of Dance - the best school in the country - she is sure her life is about to be spectacular. What Tara doesn'trealise is how far behind she is in her training, and that there's a whole lot more to surviving the Academy than just dancing...
Bunheads (2012) After impulsively marrying a man, a Las Vegas showgirl winds up teaching ballet alongside her new mother-in-law in the small coastal town of Paradise, California.
First Position (2012) - Follow dancers training for the Youth America Grand Prix, one of the world's most prestigious ballet competitions. The stakes are high: their performances will determine the success or failure of the young dancers' dreams.

Ballroom
 The Story of Vernon and Irene Castle (1939) - documentary-style biopic about early ballroom dance stars Vernon and Irene Castle.Roseland (1977) - The film is made up of three connected short features, The Waltz, The Hustle and The Peabody. All three stories share a theme of the protagonists trying to find the right dance partner, and all are set in the Roseland Ballroom in New York City.
 Strictly Ballroom (1992) - plot based on competitive ballroom dance.
 Shall We Dance? (1996) - Japanese movie.
 Dance with Me (1998) - starring Vanessa L. Williams and Chayanne - plot based on Latin dancing: ballroom vs. street.
 Dance with the Wind (2004) - South Korean film about a man who falls in love with ballroom dancing, but finds himself drawn into the sordid and corrupt world of "cabaret bars". After he seduces the police chief's wife, a female detective is assigned to go undercover to collect evidence against him. Once the two get to know each other, she asks him to teach her how to dance.
 Shall We Dance? (2004) - remake of the 1996 Japanese movie, starring Jennifer Lopez and Richard Gere.
 Mad Hot Ballroom (2005) - a documentary about a ballroom dance program for fifth graders in the New York City public school system.Marilyn Hotchkiss' Ballroom Dancing and Charm School (2005)
 Innocent Steps (2005) - Starring South Korean Actress Moon Geun-Young, she was obliged to replace her older sister—a trained dancer supposed to compete in order to pay for a family debt.
 Take the Lead (2006) - starring Antonio Banderas as a ballroom dance studio teacher who volunteers to teach dance in a New York public school.

Hip Hop/Street
 Wild Style (1983)
 Beat Street (1984)
 Body Rock (1984)
 Breakin' (1984)
 Breakin' 2: Electric Boogaloo (1984)
 Fast Forward (1985)
 Save the Last Dance (2001) - Stars Julia Stiles, Sean Patrick Thomas, Kerry Washington and Terry Kinney.
 Honey (2003) - Stars Jessica Alba, Mekhi Phifer.
 You Got Served (2004) - Stars Omarion, Marques Houston and Meagan Good.
 Rize (film) (2005) (Documentary)
 Roll Bounce (2005) (Roller Dance) - Stars Bow Wow
 Save the Last Dance 2 (2006) - Stars Columbus Short, Ne-Yo and Izabella Miko.
 Step Up (2006) - Stars Channing Tatum, Jenna Dewan and Mario (entertainer).
 Take the Lead (2006) - Stars Antonio Banderas
 Break Out (2007)
 Feel the Noise (2007)
 Planet B-Boy (2007) (Documentary)
 Stomp the Yard (2007) - Stars Columbus Short, Meagan Good, Chris Brown and Ne-Yo.
 How She Move (2007/2008)
 B-Girl (2008)
 Make It Happen (film) (2008)
 Step Up 2: The Streets (2008) - Stars Briana Evigan, Robert Hoffman (actor), Channing Tatum, Adam Sevani and Cassie.
 Dance Flick (2009)
 Step Up 3D (2010) - Stars Adam Sevani and Alyson Stoner.
 Stomp the Yard 2: Homecoming (2010) - Stars Columbus Short, Collins Pennie and Pooch Hall.
 StreetDance 3D (2010) - Stars George Sampson, Diversity (dance troupe) and Flawless.
 Honey 2 (2011) Stars Katerina Graham
 You Got Served: Beat the World (2011)
 StreetDance 2 (2012)
 Battlefield America (2012)
 Step Up Revolution (2012)
 Battle of the Year (2013)
 Step Up: All In (2014)

Swing
With the Whiteys Lindy Hoppers
 Hellzapoppin' by Henry C. Potter (1941)
 A Day at the Races by Sam Wood (1937)
Modern films
 The Jungle Book by Walt Disney (1967)
 Malcolm X by Spike Lee (1992)
 Swing Kids by Thomas Carter (1993)
 The Mask by Chuck Russell (1994)
 Love N' Dancing by Robert Iscove (2009)
 Toy Story short film (2009)
 Leading Ladies by Daniel Beahm, Erika Randall Beahm (2010)
 Midnight in Paris by Woody Allen (2011)

TangoSee also Tango (dance)#Tango in filmThe Tango Lesson (1997) - starring Sally Potter and Pablo Verón, directed by Sally Potter.Tango (1998) - starring Cecilia Narova and Mía Maestro, directed by Carlos Saura. Popular dancers and folk groups demonstrate what is considered to be the national dance of Argentina. Over 300 dancers participate as they are photographed by the master cinematographer, Vittorio Storaro.
 Tango Bar (1998) - starring Raúl Juliá.Assassination Tango (2002) - starring Robert Duvall, Rubén Blades and Kathy Baker, directed by Robert Duvall.

Other
 Funny Face (1957) - A musical with Audrey Hepburn and Fred Astaire. The most memorable scene is where a talented Audrey Hepburn dances a jazzy ballet with two backup dancers.
 Shall We Dance (1937) - a Fred Astaire/Ginger Rogers musical with much dance, including ballet. One of the most memorable dances is on roller skates.
 Singin' in the Rain (1952) - starring Gene Kelly.
 Oh... Rosalinda!! (1955) - Directed by Michael Powell and Emeric Pressburger, starring Anton Walbrook and Ludmilla Tchérina. Based on the operetta Die Fledermaus by Johann Strauss but updated to take place in post-war Vienna as occupied by the four-powers of Britain, the United States, France and Russia.
 The King and I (1956) - starring Yul Brynner and Deborah Kerr has many unique dance scenes, but the most memorable is "Shall we dance" sung by Kerr where they waltz alone in the royal ballroom. 
 Luna de Miel (1959) - Directed by Michael Powell and starring Ludmilla Tchérina and Antonio. A light story showcasing the talents of Antonio and his troupe of Spanish dancers. Also many travelogue style scenes of Spain before the tourist boom.
 Saturday Night Fever (1977) - starring John Travolta, featuring a disco dancing competition.
 All That Jazz (1979) - A semi-autobiographical film directed by famed Broadway choreographer Bob Fosse. The film portrays the life of a theater director and choreographer as he tries to balance work with his personal life. Shows the process of choreographing and rehearsing for a Broadway show.
 Footloose (1984) - starring Kevin Bacon, about a town in which dancing is banned.
 Dirty Dancing (1987) - plot based on club/performance partner dancing.
 Tap (1989)
 Sing (1989)Flamenco (1995) - A must-see for flamenco lovers. Performers: Paco de Lucía, Manolo Sanlúcar, Enrique Morente, Joaquin Cortes, Jose Menese, Lole y Manuel, Mario Maya, Jose Merce, Matilde Coral, Carmen Linares, Merche Esmeralda, Chocolate, Manuela Carrasco, Farruco, Fernanda de Utrera, La Paquera de Jerez, Manzanita, Ketama, Agujeta, Manuel Moneo, Paco Toronjo, Maria Pages, Aurora Vargas, Remedios Amaya, Juana la del Revuelo, La Macanita, Chano Lobato, Rancapino, Tomatito, Potito, Duquende, Belen Maya, El Grilo.
 The King is Dancing (2000) depicts the life of Jean-Baptiste Lully and his relationship with King Louis XIV of France.
 Save the Last Dance (2001) - starring Julia Stiles, a high school student who strives to get into the Juilliard Dance Academy.
 Dirty Dancing: Havana Nights (2004) - loose sequel to Dirty Dancing Step Up (2006) - A hip hop meets ballet love story.
 Make It Happen (2008) - A story about a girl (played by Mary Elizabeth Winstead) who finds a new dance technique; burlesque cross hip hop.
 Another Cinderella Story (2008) - Another movie based on the classic Cinderella story starring Selena Gomez as a talented dancer in high school who falls for the celebrity dancer played by Drew Seeley. The movie features many pop and hip hop dance scenes and as well as a classic tango ballroom dance. 
 Pina (2011)
 Love n' Dancing (2009)
 Turn the Beat Around (2010)
 The War Zone 3D (2011)
 Jig (2011) - A film about Irish Dancers competing at the World Championships in Glasgow 2010.
 Footloose (2011)
 Strictly Irish Dance (2011) - A two-part documentary aired in Ireland about Irish Dancers competing at the World Championships in Dublin 2011.
 I'll Take My Chances (2011)
 Frances Ha (2012)
 Magic Mike (2012)
 The Big Jig (2012) -A TLC documentary about Irish Dancers competing at the World Championships in Belfast 2012.
 Underground (1995) - directed by Emir Kusturica, with music by Goran Bregovic. Plenty of Balkan dancing.
 Make a Move (2014)
 Magic Mike XXL (2015)
 Pop In Q (2016)

 Films with memorable dance scenes 
 The Four Horsemen of the Apocalypse (1921) - Rudolph Valentino dancing Tango.
 After Seben (1929) - short film starring George Snowden and featuring Breakaway.
 Flying Down to Rio (1933) - Carioca dance and more.
 A Day at the Races (1937) - featuring lindy hop and Frankie Manning.
 Keep Punching (1939) - featuring Frankie Manning in the Big Apple sequence
 Cottontail aka Hot Chocolates (1941) - Soundie featuring the Whitey's Lindy Hoppers, including Frankie Manning and lindy hop.
 Hellzapoppin' (1941) - a film remembered for its lindy hop scenes and Frankie Manning dance performances.
 Never on Sunday (1960) - scenes of Greek line and solo dancing.
 Zorba the Greek (1964) - the origin of Sirtaki.
 The Sound of Music (1965) - has a scene of Ländler dances. However, it was choreographed in an American ballroom way, rather than in an authentic Austrian folk way.
 El Bolero de Raquel (Raquel's Bolero) (1967) - The movie star Cantinflas featuring a bootblack, who, in one episode, feebly joins a professional dancer during her performance to Ravel's Bolero producing both comical and highly artistic Spanish dance. The title is a pun for Ravel's Bolero.
 Saturday Night Fever (1977) - featuring John Travolta.
 Flashdance (1983) - Jennifer Beals' character doing a breakdance routine during a prestigious dance school audition to the Oscar-winning song "Flashdance... What a Feeling".
 Pee-wee's Big Adventure (1985) - Pee-wee goes to a bar and does the "Peewee Dance" while listening to Tequila by The Champs.
 Hairspray (1988) and (2007) - featuring line dance.
 Earth Girls Are Easy (1988) - Dance in the disco.
 Scent of a Woman (1992) - Al Pacino as a blind colonel dances Argentine Tango.
 Addams Family Values (1993) - featuring Raul Julia in a stunning scene of Tango.
 Pulp Fiction (1994) - featuring John Travolta and Uma Thurman in a twist contest.
 Chicago (2002) - There is the most famous Cell Block Tango number.
 The Fighting Temptations (2003) - Cuba Gooding Jr. as Darrin Hill, successfully does a backflip while directing his church choir. He is later seen breakdancing during the end credits.
 Napoleon Dynamite (2004) - Jon Heder dances to Jamiroquai's "Canned Heat".
 Toy Story 3 (2010) - Buzz Lightyear and Jessie do a paso doble dance before the credits.
 The Pauper's Joy (1958) - starring a Bulgarian rachenitsa competition based on the short story "The Windmill" by the Bulgarian writer Elin Pelin.
 The Secret of the Grain (2007), original title La graine et le mulet - starring Hafsia Herzi in a belly dance episode.
 Before Your Eyes (2009) - a Turkish film featuring a wedding episode with a traditional circle dance with simple steps and hands hold together.
 Gadjo dilo (The Crazy Stranger) (1997) - featuring plenty of Romani music and dancing including a memorable scene of a dance on a grave of a family member, out of grief.
 Train of Life, original title Train de vie'' (1998) - featuring a stunning scene of Klezmer vs. Gypsy dancing.

See also 

Dance on television

External links

 
Film
Lists of films by topic
Dance

fr:Film de danse
1980s in film